Arthur Rosenthal (24 February 1887, Fürth, Germany – 15 September 1959, Lafayette, Indiana) was a German mathematician.

Career
Rosenthal's mathematical studies started in 1905 in Munich, under Ferdinand Lindemann and Arnold Sommerfeld at the University of Munich and the Technical University Munich, as well as at the University of Göttingen. After submitting his thesis on regular polyhedra in 1909, he was promoted to assistant at the Technical University in 1911 and then associate professor in the University of Munich in 1920. The following year he was appointed associate professor in the University of Heidelberg, with a promotion to full professor in 1930. Between 1932 and 1933 he served as dean in the faculty of mathematics and natural sciences, but was forced from his university position as a result of Nazi policies against German Jews. He moved to the Netherlands in 1936 and from there emigrated to the United States in 1939. He was appointed lecturer and research fellow at the University of Michigan in 1940 with a promotion to assistant professor in 1943. In 1946 he became associate professor at the University of New Mexico and the following year moved to the Purdue University as full professor, where he remained until his retirement in 1957. In 1954 he was formally reinstated in the University of Heidelberg. A scholarship at Purdue University is named in his honor. His doctoral students include Theodore Chihara.

Research
Rosenthal's mathematical research was in geometry, in particular the classification of regular polyhedra and Hilbert's axioms. He also made contributions in analysis, including to Carathéodory's theory of measure. With the Swiss mathematician Michel Plancherel, he made contributions in ergodic theory and dynamical systems.

See also
Hartogs–Rosenthal theorem

References
, Obituary in German (German Mathematical Society)
 Gabriele Dörflinger: Artur Rosenthal, in: Historia Mathematica Heidelbergensis

Technical University of Munich alumni
Purdue University faculty
Academic staff of Heidelberg University
20th-century German mathematicians
Refugees in the United States
Jewish emigrants from Nazi Germany to the United States
1887 births
1959 deaths
University of Michigan faculty